Peabody Award winners and honorable mentions.

1940s

1940

1941

1942

1943

1944

1945

1946

1947

1948

1949

 List1940